Betty Workman (September 26, 1924 – May 1, 2018) was an American politician who served in the Maryland House of Delegates from District 1B from 1987 to 1999. She was a member of the Democratic party.

She died on May 1, 2018, in La Vale, Maryland at age 93.

References

1924 births
2018 deaths
Democratic Party members of the Maryland House of Delegates
Politicians from Cumberland, Maryland